In anatomy, the Schneiderian membrane is the membranous lining of the maxillary sinus cavity.
Microscopically there is a bilaminar membrane with pseudostratified ciliated columnar epithelial cells on the internal (or cavernous) side and periosteum on the osseous side. The size of the sinuses varies in different skulls, and even on the two sides of the same skull. This membrane is present in the nasal chamber which helps to smell (olfactory receptor)

References

Human head and neck